Aurelian was Roman emperor from 270 to 275.

Aurelian or Aurelianus may also refer to:

People
"Aurelian" is the adjectival form of Aurelius and often refers to the emperor Marcus Aurelius (r. 161–180).
Aurelian of Limoges, 2nd bishop of Limoges
Aurelianus (consul 400) (fl. 393–416), Eastern-Roman politician, twice Praetorian prefect of the East, Consul in 400
Aurelianus (Gallo-Roman) (5th century), chief advisor to Clovis I, made the first count of Meledunum (Melun)
Ambrosius Aurelianus, 5th-century Romano-British war leader
Aurelianus of Arles (6th century), bishop
Paul Aurelian, 6th century Welsh saint 
Aurelian of Réôme (fl. 840–850), 9th century Frankish music-theorist
Aurelian Smith, professional wrestler known as Grizzly Smith (1932–2010)
Aurelian Smith, Jr., his son, professional wrestler known as Jake Roberts (b. 1955)

Other uses
Aurelianus (genus), seed bugs
Aurelian (entomology), archaic term for lepidopterist
"The Aurelian", a 1930 short story by Vladimir Nabokov
Aurelians, an alien race in the video game Advent Rising
Lorgar Aurelian, primarch of the Word Bearers in the fictional Warhammer 40000 universe